The men's individual compound competition at the 2007 World Archery Championships took place in July 2007 in Leipzig, Germany. 139 archers entered the competition. Following a qualifying FITA round, the top 128 archers qualified for the 7-round knockout round, drawn according to their qualification round scores. The semi-finals and finals then took place on 15 July.

Qualifying
The following archers were the leading 16 qualifiers:

Finals

References

2007 World Archery Championships